The United States presidential election in the Nevada, 1916 took place on November 7, 1916 as part of the 1916 United States presidential election. Voters chose three representatives, or electors to the Electoral College, who voted for president and vice president.

Nevada was won by incumbent President of the United States, former Governor of New Jersey Woodrow Wilson, who won the state by a comfortable margin of nearly seventeen points and carried every county in the state except Douglas, a county that since statehood has voted Democratic only for William Jennings Bryan in the "free silver" elections of 1896 and 1900 and for the Franklin Delano Roosevelt landslides of 1932 and 1936. Nevada voted more than 5% more Democratic than the nation as a whole, an anomaly exceeded only by Bryan and Roosevelt in their first two elections each.

Results

Results by county

See also
United States presidential elections in Nevada

References

1916
Nev
1916 Nevada elections